Brian Moynahan (30 March 1941 – 1 April 2018) was an English journalist, historian and biographer. He was born in 1941, the son of the dermatologist Edmund Moynahan of Guy's and Great Ormond Street Hospitals. He was educated at Sherborne School and Corpus Christi College, Cambridge, where he was a Foundation Scholar and editor of the student magazines Cambridge Opinion and Broadsheet. He graduated in 1962 with a double First in history.

He was a leader writer with The Yorkshire Post before covering wars in Vietnam, Laos and Borneo, the violencia in Colombia and the American intervention in the Dominican Republic, for Town Magazine, and The Times. He also wrote on industry and business in the Far East. He was editor of Town before joining the staff of The Sunday Times in 1968.

As a foreign correspondent, Moynahan covered the Arab-Israeli, Ethiopian and Lebanese conflicts, as well as events in Europe and Russia. He was latterly The Sunday Times Europe editor, based in Paris, before concentrating on writing books.

These include the award-winning history, The Russian Century, The Faith, a history of Christianity, If God Spare My Life, a biography of William Tyndale, described as "a triumph, authoritative, vital, passionate, closely attentive to the sources" and the best-selling Airport International and Jungle Soldier. His last book, Leningrad Siege and Symphony, an account of Shostakovich's Seventh Symphony, was a Spectator Book of The Year.

Death
Moynahan died on 1 April 2018 at the age of 77.

Works
 Airport International (1978)
 Fool's Paradise (1983)
 Claws of the Bear, a history of the Soviet Armed Forces (1989)
 Comrades 1917, Russia in Revolution (1992)
 The Russian Century (1994)
 Rasputin, the Saint who Sinned 1998
 The British Century 1999
 The Faith, a history of Christianity 2003
 If God Spare My Life 2003
 The French Century 2007
 Forgotten Soldiers 2008
 Jungle Soldier 2010
 Leningrad Siege and Symphony, Shostakovich's Seventh Symphony 2014

Review
“A stupendous story, driven by a furious narrative yet biblical in its thematic confrontations of beauty and evil. It’s vivid in three dimensions: The Red Army’s battles with Hitler’s war machine; the ordeals of the Russian people terrorized by the malevolent maniac in the Kremlin; and throughout the faint but swelling counterpoint of hope as the great Dmitri Shostakovich struggles to write the score of his Seventh Symphony to express the soul of his martyred city . . . This is history to cherish.”—Sir Harold Evans, Editor at Large at Reuters, author of The American Century, and publisher of The Russian Century, writing about Moynahan's book Leningrad: Siege and Symphony.

References

External links
Interview with Brian Moynahan, quercusbooks.co.uk, 23 August 2010.

1941 births
2018 deaths
Alumni of Corpus Christi College, Cambridge
English journalists
English reporters and correspondents
English writers
People educated at Sherborne School
The Sunday Times people